Khedado Ki Dhani is a village in Jhunjhunu district of Jaipur division of Rajasthan state. It comes under Pacheri Kalan Police thana area. Sagwara is a nearby village. It can be accessed by a road from Mahendargarh-Narnaul Road. When we go to Narnaul from Mahendergarh it is on the right side approach road to Sagwa a nearby village of Khedado Ki Dhani.

References

Villages in Bharatpur district